The Information Design Association (IDA) was launched at a meeting chaired by Nick Ross at the Royal Society of Arts in London on 14 May 1991. in the belief that 'Good information design results in the clear and effective presentation of information. It combines skills in graphic design, writing, and human factors to make complex information easier to understand.'

A multi-disciplinary membership organisation for practitioners, the public interest and all those interested in information design, it has organised many evening meetings with visiting speakers, and a number of Information Design Conferences (the first five of which had been run by the Information Design Journal (IDJ), which had many links with the IDA), most recently in 2014.

Writing at the end of the 1990s, Robert E. Horn summed up the IDA's international contribution in its first decade:

References

External links
 Information Design Association
 Information Design Journal 

1991 establishments in the United Kingdom
Organizations established in 1991
Learned societies of the United Kingdom
Professional associations based in the United Kingdom
Design institutions
Non-profit organisations based in the United Kingdom